Razeh (also Romanized as Razzeh; also known as Deh-e Razeh, Deh-e Reẕā, Deh Rezā, Deh Riza, Paza, Rezā, and Riza) is a village in Tabas-e Masina Rural District, Gazik District, Darmian County, South Khorasan Province, Iran. Portions of the 1928 German silent film Folly of Love were filmed here. At the 2006 census, its population was 261, in 60 families.

References 

Populated places in Darmian County